Salamanga is a town in southern Mozambique.

Transport 

The town is served by a terminus of a branchline of the Goba railway of the national railway network. The main traffic is limestone used in the manufacture of cement.

In 2008, $8m was to be spent rebuilding the line.

See also 

 Railway stations in Mozambique

References 

Populated places in Maputo Province